Pseudoeurhynchothrips is a genus of thrips in the family Phlaeothripidae.

Species
 Pseudoeurhynchothrips bidens
 Pseudoeurhynchothrips mameti

References

Phlaeothripidae
Thrips
Thrips genera